The 2014 Challenger Pulcra Lachiter Biella was a professional tennis tournament played on outdoor red clay courts. It was part of the 2014 ATP Challenger Tour. It took place in Biella, Italy between 8–14 September 2014. It returned for the first time since 2010.

Entrants

Seeds

 Rankings are as of September 1, 2014.

Other entrants
The following players received wildcards into the singles main draw:
  Marco Bortolotti
  Erik Crepaldi
  Pietro Licciardi
  Stefano Napolitano

The following player entered as an alternate:
  Henri Laaksonen

The following player entered using a protected ranking:
  Sandro Ehrat

The following players received entry from the qualifying draw:
  Maxime Chazal
  Nikola Ćirić
  Viktor Galović 
  Lorenzo Sonego

Champions

Singles

 Matteo Viola def.  Filippo Volandri, 7–5, 6–1

Doubles

 Marco Cecchinato /  Matteo Viola def.  Frank Moser /  Alexander Satschko, 7–5, 6–0

External links
Official website
ITF search

Canella Challenger
Tennis tournaments in Italy